William Theodore Schulte (August 19, 1890 – December 7, 1966) was an American politician who served five terms as a U.S. Representative from Indiana from 1933 to 1943.

Biography 
Born in St. Bernard Township, Platte County, Nebraska, Schulte attended the public schools of St. Bernard Township, Nebraska.
He moved with his parents to Hammond, Indiana, where he attended high school and received a business training.

He engaged in the theatrical business until 1918.
He was also interested in agricultural pursuits.
He served as member of the city council of Hammond, Indiana from 1918 to 1922.
He resumed the theatrical business until 1932.

Congress 
Schulte was elected as a Democrat to the Seventy-third and to the four succeeding Congresses (March 4, 1933 – January 3, 1943).
He was an unsuccessful candidate for renomination in 1942 to the Seventy-eighth Congress.

In 1934 he sponsored a bill, the Alien Exclusion Act, which aimed, among other things, to prevent the employment of foreign nationals in border cities,

Later career and death 
He was a coordinator of field operations in the labor division of the War Production Board, Washington, D.C. from 1942 to 1944.
He returned to Lake County, Indiana, and engaged in agricultural pursuits, engaged in the automobile business at Michigan City, Indiana, from October 1947 to March 1949.
Sales representative of a construction machinery firm.

He died in Hammond, Indiana, on December 7, 1966.
He was interred in St. Joseph's Cemetery.

References

External links 
 

1890 births
1966 deaths
People from Platte County, Nebraska
Democratic Party members of the United States House of Representatives from Indiana
20th-century American politicians